is the red-light district which exists between the sandbank of the  and the  in Fukuoka City, Fukuoka Prefecture, Japan. It is named after a popular, but very short-lived, entertainment quarter of Edo, which existed in the late 18th century. The name "Nakasu" can be translated as "the island in the middle", as Nakasu is an island between two rivers.

Overview
Nakasu is the largest red-light district in the western Japan area after Osaka. The number of restaurants and stores, including adult-entertainment establishments, is approximately 3,500; over 60,000 people reportedly visit Nakasu every night. Nakasu is also home to a number of fashionable restaurants. Once, fans of the local baseball team, Fukuoka SoftBank Hawks, dove from the Fukuhaku Deai Bridge into the river after the team won the championship. The nearest subway station from Nakasu is the Nakasu-Kawabata Station of the Fukuoka City Subway.

History

Present day of Nakasu has 18 bridges in total: 7 of them are built at the side of the Chūō-ku, and 11 at the side of the Hakata-ku. Nakasu previously featured Tamaya, a department store of long standing, and movie theatres, although the center of commerce has moved to the Tenjin and Daimyō districts in Chūō-ku.

After the establishment of a shopping complex, the Canal City Hakata at neighbouring Sumiyoshi district in 1996, the areas of Tenjin, Nakasu, and Hakata Station, all of which are located in the middle of the place between the Tenjin district and Canal City Hakata, were unified. The redevelopment of unification with adjacent Kawabata district is also in progress. On March 29, 2002, the Nakasu Special Investigators, a squad of the Fukuoka Prefectural Police, was formed to prevent crime. A huge commercial complex, the "gate's" was opened in 2006, at the site the Tamaya was located.

In popular culture

The 2012 video game Yakuza 5 features a fictional district called Nagasugai, based on Nakasu. This is where main series protagonist Kazuma Kiryu comes to start a new life as a taxi driver under the alias of Taichi Suzuki.

Sources

See also
Nakasu (Edo)

External links

Nakasu 
Nakasu Tourism Association, Town of Nakasu Joint Association Homepage 

Geography of Fukuoka
Red-light districts in Japan
Tourist attractions in Fukuoka
Yakuza